Attorney General Rodriguez may refer to:

Anabelle Rodriguez (born 1950), Attorney General of Puerto Rico
Cara Rodriguez (born 1976), Acting Attorney General of Oklahoma
Jean Alain Rodríguez Sánchez (born 1975), Attorney General of the Dominican Republic

See also
General Rodriguez (disambiguation)